ISAE may stand for:

International Society for Applied Ethology, behaviour and welfare of confined or domesticated animals
Institut supérieur de l'aéronautique et de l'espace, National Higher French Institute of Aeronautics and Space
International Standard on Assurance Engagement, in accounting
ISAE 3000, one Assurance standard